Nephele vau is a moth of the family Sphingidae first described by Francis Walker in 1856. It is common throughout most of Africa south of the Sahara, but rarer in southern Africa.

References

Nephele (moth)
Moths described in 1856
Moths of Africa
Moths of the Middle East